The Maysan governorate election of 2013 was held on 20 April 2013 alongside elections for all other governorates outside Iraqi Kurdistan, Kirkuk, Anbar, and Nineveh.

Results 

|- style="background-color:#E9E9E9"
!align="left" colspan=2 valign=top|Party/Coalition!! Allied national parties !! Leader !!Seats !! Change !!Votes
|-
|bgcolor="#000000"|
|align=left|Liberal Coalition|| align=left|Sadrist Movement || Muqtada al-Sadr || 9 || 2 || 89,906
|-
|bgcolor="#FF0000"|
|align=left|State of Law Coalition || align=left|Islamic Dawa PartyNational Reform Trend ||Nouri Al-Maliki|| 8 || 4* || 77,917
|-
|bgcolor="#009933"|
|align=left|Citizens Alliance ||align=left|ISCI|| Ammar al-Hakim|| 6 || 2 || 63,060
|-
|
|align=left|Honesty and Generosity || || || 1 || 1 || 11,605
|-
|
|align=left|National Partnership Gathering||align=left| || || 1 || 1  || 10,771
|-
|
|align=left|National Flag Gathering|| || || 1 || 1 || 9,814
|-
|bgcolor="#286F42"|
|align=left|Islamic Dawa Party – Iraq Organisation || || || 1 || 1 || 5,615
|-
|
|align=left|Maysan Civil Alliance || || ||  || || 2,894
|-
|bgcolor="#098DCD"|
|align=left|Al Iraqia National and United Coalition || align=left| || || ||  || 771
|-
|colspan=2 align=left|Total || || || 27 || - || 272,353
|-
|colspan=7 align=left|Sources: Musings on Iraq, ISW, IHEC Maysan Results, List of political coalition approved for election in provincial councils - IHEC , al-Sumaria - Maysan Coalitions
|-
|colspan=7 align=left|Notes: *Although the State of Law Coalition only won 8 seats in 2009, the National Reform Trend ran as part of the State of Law Coalition in 2013. The NRT had won 4 seats in Maysan in 2009.

References 

2013 Iraqi governorate elections